Jan de Hartog (April 22, 1914 – September 22, 2002) was a Dutch playwright, novelist and occasional social critic who moved to the United States in the early 1960s and became a Quaker.

Early life 
Jan de Hartog was born to a Dutch Calvinist minister and professor of theology, Arnold Hendrik, and his wife, Lucretia de Hartog, who herself was a lecturer in medieval mysticism, in 1914. He was raised in the city of Haarlem, in the Netherlands.

At around the age of 11, he ran away to become a cabin boy, otherwise referred to as a "sea mouse", on board a Dutch fishing boat. His father had him brought home, but shortly afterwards, Jan ran off to sea again. The experiences thus gained became material for some of his future novels, like many of his other life experiences.

At 16, he briefly attended the Kweekschool voor de Zeevaart in Amsterdam, a training college for the Dutch merchant marine, but only for year. His own account was that he was expelled and was told emphatically by his angry schoolmaster, "This school is not for pirates!"

De Hartog was a coal shoveller on the night shifts with the Amsterdam Harbour Police until 1932. As he often had spare time, he began to write there.

While employed as skipper of a tour boat on the Amsterdam Canals, he wrote several mysteries featuring Inspector Gregor Boyarski of the Amsterdam Harbor Police. At the time, he used a pseudonym "F. R. Eckmar". The words, "luckily", according to the author himself, were never translated into English.

His theater career began in the late 1930s at the Amsterdam Municipal Theater, where he acted in and wrote a play.

World War II 
De Hartog's career as a writer, as well as his personal life, was decisively influenced by a coincidence that occurred during World War II. In May 1940, just ten days before Nazi Germany had invaded and swiftly occupied the hitherto-neutral Netherlands, de Hartog published his book Hollands Glorie (Holland's Glory, translated much later into English as Captain Jan).

The novel described the life of the highly skilled sailors on ocean-going tugboats, a specialized field of nautical enterprise in which the Dutch have always taken the lead. Without saying it in so many words, de Hartog portrayed the sailors, who arw doing a difficult, dangerous and poorly-rewarded job, as the modern successors to the bold navigators of the Dutch Golden Age.

In fact, the book's plot as such had nothing political, anti-German, or anti-Nazi, the sailor protagonists' conflict being mainly with nature and with their highly paternalistic and authoritarian and thoroughly-Dutch employers. Nevertheless, for a country undergoing the shock of invasion and occupation, the book, with its outspoken assertion of and pride in Dutch identity l, became a bestseller in the occupied Netherlands and a focus of popular opposition to the Nazi occupation. As a result, the Gestapo took a lively interest in de Hartog himself, who had joined the non-military Dutch resistance, performed and wrote plays, and assisted in the concealment and the relocation of Jewish babies to avoid having them sent to concentration camps. His book was banned, and he was forced into hiding by assuming the identity of an elderly woman in a nursing home. Eventually, he staged a difficult and adventure-filled escape to England. His book became the best selling novel of the war years in the Netherlands.

In London, he became deeply involved in the community of the exiled Dutch sailors. The exiles worked with their British allies, often by going on dangerous missions, with inadequately-armed or sometimes completely-unarmed boats.

He joined the Netherlands merchant navy as a correspondent in 1943 and later served as a ship's captain for which he received the Netherlands' "Cross of Merit."

The latter was made into a movie starring Sophia Loren, Trevor Howard, and William Holden under the title The Key and also started de Hartog on the route to becoming a pacifist, which later culminated when he joined the Religious Society of Friends, also known as the Quakers.

Postwar 
De Hartog had many hesitations about authorizing the translation of Hollands Glorie into English, and when he finally did in 1947, the English version (entitled Captain Jan) had less success as the Dutch original. However, in the wake of the war, he made the decision to remain in the United Kingdom. He also made the professional decision to write most of his later works in English, beginning with The Lost Sea (1951), which was a fictional account of his experiences working aboard ship as a boy, colloquially called a "sea mouse."

Precisely because in the war years, he had been regarded as close to a national hero, quite a few people in the Netherlands resented his decision to write in English and so felt betrayed by and abandoned by him. Sales of his books in the English-speaking world soared, but his reputation in his home country plunged and took years to recover. 

For his part, de Hartog continued to regard himself as and to take pride in being a Dutchman, and many of his later books had Dutch protagonists and themes. Indeed, for many people outside the Netherlands, the books became a major source of information about Dutch society, culture, and modern history.

In 1952, while visiting New York, he encountered a play that he had written while he had still been in hiding during the war and had sold the rights to while he was in England.  The play was called The Fourposter. A New York Times reviewer called it "the most civilized comedy we have had on marriage for years."  It went on to win de Hartog a Tony Award at the 6th annual Tony Awards Show for Best Play. Columbia Pictures also made The Fourposter into a partially animated movie, starring Rex Harrison and Lilli Palmer. The scenes from the play were linked by cartoon sequences between them. The film was nominated for both a Golden Globe and an Academy Award for its cinematography. Later, in 1966, it became the musical I Do! I Do!. The play also appeared under its original name at the Theatre New Brunswick in 1974.

Jan and Marjorie de Hartog took a 90-foot Dutch ship (called The Rival) and transformed it into a houseboat, which they made their home. During the severe floods in the Netherlands of 1953, The Rival was transformed into a floating hospital about which wrote in The Little Ark.

Move to America 
In the late 1950s, the de Hartogs decided to take The Rival to the US on the deck of a freighter. They had difficulty locating a dock with cranes large enough to lift the houseboat from the freighter, but they eventually made for Houston, Texas. They decided that they liked it there and so stayed.

While Jan was out lecturing at the University of Houston on playwriting, Marjorie was looking for community volunteer opportunities for both of them to participate in. She decided on Jefferson Davis County Hospital. Conditions there were bad, and with the hospital being significantly underfunded, understaffed, and overcrowded, theu showed no sign of getting better.

Jan decided to document the conditions there, which resulted in the non-fiction memoir The Hospital (1964), which exposed the awful conditions of Houston's charity hospitals in the 1960s. The book received a national response but also a local response in which, within a week of the book's release, nearly four hundred citizens volunteered at the hospital. It led to significant reforms of the city's indigent healthcare system through the creation of the Harris County Hospital District. It also led, however, to considerable hostility and many anonymous threats, which finally forced the de Hartogs to move back to Europe.

In 1967, Jan wrote The Captain, which revisited his love of the sea and featured a central character based loosely on himself called Martinus Harinxma, who had first appeared in The Lost Sea (1951). The book was a success, and Martinus would live on as a central character in several sequels.

Before starting work on the second in the Martinus series, Jan wrote of the experience of adopting his two daughters, who were Korean War orphans, in The Children, which appeared in 1969. He afterwards wrote a fictionalised account of the origin of the Religious Society of Friends, The Peaceable Kingdom: An American Saga, in 1972. It was nominated for the Nobel Prize and was followed eight years later by a Quaker novel, The Lamb's War (1980).

In 1985, Jan was awarded an honorary Doctor of Humane Letters (L.H.D.) degree from Whittier College.

He published the next book in the Martinus series, The Commodore, in 1986 while he was living in "The Walled Garden" in Somerset, England, and it was followed by The Centurion (1989), which explored an interest in which he and his wife had become involved, dowsing. In the novel, Martinus Harinxma dabbled with dowsing and was led on a journey that followed in the footsteps of a Roman centurion. The real story, in terms of researching and writing this book, was not much different from the book itself, with the exception of fictional elements, which were used to carry the story along.

In 1993, Jan and Marjorie returned to Houston with minimum publicity, to a much-omproved atmosphere. Shortly afterward, he returned to the Quaker theme to write the last in the series, The Peculiar People, in 1992.

That was followed by his last fully-completed novel, The Outer Buoy: A Story of the Ultimate Voyage in 1994, which was once again a Martinus Harinxma novel that expressed quite clearly Jan de Hartog's own fascination with becoming old, the inner explorations of the mind, and perhaps even a desire to rest.

In 1996, Jan de Hartog was chosen to be honored as the annual "Special Guest" at the Netherlands Film Festival.

Six years later, in 2002, Jan de Hartog died at the age of 88. Appropriately, his ashes were taken to sea on an ocean-going tugboat, the SMITWIJS SINGAPORE, and were scattered on the surface of the sea at position 52.02.5 N – 04.05.0 E at 13.10 hrs LT by his wife, Marjorie, and his son, Nick, while other family members spread flowers at the site.

A few years later, Marjorie de Hartog decided to collate and to edit a short story that her husband had been working on some time ago in the hope of releasing it in his memory. A View of the Ocean was published in 2007, and was the story, in essence, of Jan's own mother's death, which reveals his first contact with Quakers.

Media 
Jan de Hartog wrote many of his plays, books, and magazine articles in Dutch. Some of his plays and books were adapted as movies. It is the intent of this section to document those of his works that were published in English (including some translated from the original Dutch versions by other parties).

Books

Fiction

 (also published as Stella and The Key)

 The Inspector (1960)  
 The Artist (1963)

 The Peaceable Kingdom: An American Saga (1971) 

 The Trail of the Serpent  
 Star of Peace (1983) 
 Het Helig Experiment (1983)

 The Centurion: A Novel (1989)  
 The Peculiar People (1992) 

 The Flight of the Henny
 The Call of the Sea

Stories appearing in Reader's Digest Condensed Books 
See also Reader's Digest Condensed Books.

 Mission to Borneo in Volume 30 - Summer 1957
 Duel with a Witch Doctor in Volume 31 - Autumn 1957

Non-fiction

 (released posthumously)

Adaptations of his works

Movies 

The Four Poster (1952) - 1hr 43min — Directed by Irving G. Reis
 Based on the play The Fourposter.
 Won Venice International Film Festival — Volpi Cup for Best Actress (Lilli Palmer)
 Nominated for a Golden Globe for Best Cinematography — Black and white (Hal Mohr)
 Nominated - Best Cinematography (Black-and-White) at the 26th Academy Awards (Hal Mohr)

The Key (1958) - 2hrs 1 min — Directed by Carol Reed
 Based on the novel 
 with William Holden and Sophia Loren
 Won a British Academy Award for Best British Actor (Trevor Howard)

The Spiral Road (1962) - 2hrs 25min - Directed by Robert Mulligan
 Based on the novel of the same name.
 starring Rock Hudson and Burl Ives

Lisa (1962) - 1hr 52min - Directed by Philip Dunne
 Based on the novel, The Inspector
 Released as The Inspector in the United Kingdom
 starring Dolores Hart, Stephen Boyd and Donald Pleasence
 Nominated for a Golden Globe for "Best Picture - Drama"

The Little Ark (1972) - 1hr 40min - Directed by James B. Clark
 Based on the novel of the same name.
 Nominated - Best Original Song ("Come Follow, Follow Me") at the 45th Academy Awards (Marsha Karlin and Fred Karlin)

Television 

 The Fourposter (Play on TV) (1955) - 1hr 30min - Directed by Clark Jones and aired on NBC, July 25, 1955, as an episode of the 'Producers' Showcase Series' whose tagline reads "Bringing the best of Broadway to the 21-inch screen".
 The Four Poster, 1964 Australian TV play directed by James Upshaw

References

External links 

 Biography of Jan de Hartog in the Daily Shipping Newsletter
 "The Looniverse", by Harrie Verstappen, whose sources include on-going collaborations with Marjorie de Hartog. It covers more in-depth articles regarding details of Mr. De Hartog's books. It is a source for some of the material found on this page.
 The Quaker Liar, An article by Ann Walton Sieber, which was originally published in the "Houston Press". It's a good source of information gleaned through personal contact with the De Hartogs.
 An abridged version of "Jan de Hartog: A Captain on the Ocean of Light and Love", also by Ann Sieber, includes historic photographs of Jan De Hartog provided by his wife.
 Writers Info website (in Dutch)
 
 Summary of his book: "The Hospital" which also adds to the author biography
 WeberStudies Volume 4.1 - Spring 1987  This is a transcript of a talk Jan de Hartog gave at Weber State College on November 17, 1986. It discusses his involvement with the Dutch Underground Theatre, along with notes regarding The Fourposter. While this is arguably not a proper biographical reference per Wikipedia guidelines, it should stand as a temporary one until conflicting or supporting references can be uncovered.
 Ron Slate's review of A View of the Ocean includes de Hartog biography.
  -A video, possibly of interest, (though narrated entirely in Dutch) includes old filmstock of Jan.

1914 births
2002 deaths
Converts to Quakerism
20th-century Dutch novelists
20th-century Dutch male writers
Dutch male novelists
Dutch Quakers
De Hartog, Jan
Writers from Haarlem
De Hartog, Jan
Dutch Christian pacifists